Gourmet Garage is a mini-chain of specialty/natural food markets headquartered in New York City with four locations in Manhattan as of 2022. The enterprise began as Flying Foods, a specialty food distributor, and transitioned into retail in 1992.  Gourmet Garage's 3 locations were purchased by Springfield, NJ based Village Super Markets in 2019.

History
Flying Foods was launched in 1981 by college roommates, Andy Arons and Walter Martin, and Paul Moriates, whom Martin met during a brief tenure working at Waldorf Astoria Hotel. Their mission was to import fresh foods that were not available in the United States at the time and sell them to chefs at high end restaurants in New York City, and elsewhere across the country. By 1987, when the business was sold to Kraft Foods, it had grown from one office to four and both imported foreign products and exported American artisan-made food overseas.

Gourmet Garage began as a distributor in an actual garage space in Soho. When trucks from commercial clients left, they would open their doors to the general public. In 1992, the store formally opened on Wooster Street in Soho. Arons partnered with Adam Hartman, a CPA who had helped negotiate the sale of Flying Foods, and two food business veterans, John Gottfried and Edwin Visser, to open the retailer, which prided itself on the stark contrast to specialty stores of that period. Gottfried told the New York Daily Press, "The previous approach was to sell this stuff like jewelry. We sell it like produce."

In 1994, the business moved to a larger space at the corner of Broome and Mercer in Soho. The following year they opened a new location in a former garage space on the East 64th St., still selling their high quality products at a slightly lower price. Gourmet Garage continued to pursue that audience throughout Manhattan, opening stores on the Upper East Side, in Greenwich Village, and near Lincoln Center. A new store in Tribeca just opened in mid September 2015.

Gourmet Garage has continued to develop relationships with local producers, and the product mix of the stores is heavily weighted towards fresh products and prepared foods.

Locations
 SoHo, 489 Broome St.
 Lincoln Center, 155 W 66th St.
 TriBeCa, 366 Broadway
 West Village, 585 Hudson St.

See also

List of food companies

References

External links
 

Food and drink companies of the United States
Wakefern Food Corporation